Dzema Peak is a peak,  high, standing  west-southwest of Mount Ratliff on the north side of the Watson Escarpment in Antarctica. It was named by the Advisory Committee on Antarctic Names for Lieutenant John Dzema of U.S. Navy Squadron VX-6 who was at McMurdo Station during the 1962–63 and 1963–64 seasons.

References 

Mountains of Adélie Land